Yevhen Valentynovych Lutsenko (born 10 November 1980) is a Ukrainian former professional football midfielder.

Club career
Lutsenko began playing in the Dynamo Kyiv football school, before moving to Belgium to continue his training with R.S.C. Anderlecht. In 1999, he moved to the Swiss Super League to play with Lausanne Sports. He helped the team finish second in his first year there. In 2002 with the team relegated he moved to play in the Russian Premier League with Dynamo Moscow. After a single season there he moved to another Russian club, FC Shinnik Yaroslavl, before returning to Ukraine to join Chornomorets Odessa for the 2004/05 season. The following season he played 21 games and scored 1 goal, helping the team finish third in the league. After another season in Odessa he moved to FC Zorya Luhansk in the winter transfer window of the 2006/07 season. He returned to Chornomorets on 8 August 2008.

International
He has been capped by the Ukraine national football team on two occasions.

References

External links
 Official Website Profile
 Profile and stats on Odessa Football site
 
 

Ukrainian footballers
Ukraine international footballers
Swiss Super League players
Russian Premier League players
Ukrainian Premier League players
R.S.C. Anderlecht players
FC Lausanne-Sport players
FC Dynamo Moscow players
FC Shinnik Yaroslavl players
FC Chornomorets Odesa players
FC Zorya Luhansk players
SC Tavriya Simferopol players
Ukrainian expatriate footballers
Ukrainian expatriate sportspeople in Switzerland
Expatriate footballers in Switzerland
Expatriate footballers in Belgium
Ukrainian expatriate sportspeople in Belgium
Ukrainian expatriate sportspeople in Russia
Expatriate footballers in Russia
1980 births
Living people
Association football midfielders
Footballers from Kyiv